Francesco Verde (born 16 August 1999) is an Italian football player. He plays for Tritium.

Club career
He is the product of youth teams of Brescia and started playing for their Under-19 squad in the 2015–16 season. He was loaned to Serie C club Lumezzane for the 2016–17 season. He made his Serie C debut for Lumezzane on 19 November 2016 in a game against Sambenedettese, as a 76th-minute substitute for Antonio Bacio Terracino. Upon his return from loan, he continued to play for Brescia's U-19 squad.

On 13 August 2018, he signed with Cagliari.

He made his Serie A debut for Cagliari on 24 February 2019 in a game against Sampdoria, as a 79th-minute substitute for Riccardo Doratiotto.

On 14 July 2019, he signed a 3-year contract with Olbia. On 4 August 2021, he was loaned to Serie D club Forlì.

References

External links
 

1999 births
People from Aversa
Footballers from Campania
Living people
Italian footballers
Association football forwards
F.C. Lumezzane V.G.Z. A.S.D. players
Cagliari Calcio players
Olbia Calcio 1905 players
S.S.D. Audace Cerignola players
Forlì F.C. players
Tritium Calcio 1908 players
Serie A players
Serie C players
Serie D players
Sportspeople from the Province of Caserta